Harrison Eke (February 1888 – 30 April 1917) was an English professional footballer who played as an inside-right in the Southern Football League for Southampton.

Personal life
Eke worked as a milkhand. On 21 September 1914, a month after the outbreak of the First World War, he enlisted in the Royal Fusiliers. Serving as a private, Eke contracted tuberculosis during service and was medically discharged on 7 June 1916. He died of the disease on 30 April 1917 in Bexleyheath and was buried in Bexleyheath Cemetery.

Career statistics

References

External links
Harrison Eke at 11v11

1888 births
Date of birth missing
1917 deaths
Burials in Kent
Military personnel from Cambridgeshire
British military personnel killed in World War I
People from Oakington
Sportspeople from Cambridgeshire
Association football inside forwards
English footballers
Southern Football League players
Southampton F.C. players
British Army personnel of World War I
Royal Fusiliers soldiers
20th-century deaths from tuberculosis
Tuberculosis deaths in England